Neurochyta is a genus of moths in the family Lasiocampidae. The genus was first described by Turner in 1918.

Species
Based on Lepidoptera and Some Other Life Forms:
Neurochyta edna (Swinhoe, 1902) from Australia
Neurochyta agrapta (Turner, 1936) Australia

References

Lasiocampidae